The Museum of the Second World War is a state cultural institution and museum established in 2008 in Gdańsk, Poland which is devoted to the Second World War. Its exhibits opened in 2017.

The Kwadrat architectural team won an architectural competition for the building of the Museum of the Second World War in Gdańsk.

History 
The museum was created on 1 September 2008 by way of a regulation of the Minister of Culture and National Heritage under the name Westerplatte Museum in Gdańsk. On the same day, Prime Minister Donald Tusk appointed prof. dr hab. Paweł Machcewicz as his representative for the Museum of the Second World War. The team of the representative for the museum included dr hab. Piotr M. Majewski - historian from the Warsaw University and dr Janusz Marszalec, who was the head of the Public Education Department Office of the Institute of National Remembrance in Gdańsk from 2000 to 2007. The purpose of the team included i.e. the development of a Museum of the Second World War programme concept. The concept has been presented to the public on 6 October 2008 at the Chancellery of the President of the Council of Ministers in Warsaw during a discussion with historians and museologists. The text of the concept and record of the discussion have been published in print, and is also accessible directly via the museum's website. Development of the concept and contents of the exhibitions were co-created by renowned scholars of WWII and totalitarianism, including: Norman Davies, Timothy Snyder, Tomasz Szarota, Włodzimierz Borodziej and Jerzy Wojciech Borejsza.

On 26 November 2008, the Minister of Culture and National Heritage, Mr Bogdan Zdrojewski changed the name of this institution from the Westerplatte Museum to the Museum of the Second World War in Gdansk. At the same time, he defined the scope of tasks of the facility stating: “the object of the museum’s operations is to amass a collection pertaining to the history of World War II, safeguard it, and make it available, in particular by means of exhibition, popularisation, education, and publishing”.

On 15 April 2016, the Minister of Culture and National Heritage, Mr Piotr Gliński informed about combining the Museum of the Second World War and the Museum of Westerplatte and the War of 1939 (being organised), created in 2015. Mr Gliński's decision was influenced by the negative reviews of the Main Exhibit of the museum ordered by the ministry and penned by Jan Żaryn, Piotr Semka and Piotr Niwiński.
 
At the end of 2016, the Voivodeship Administrative Court in Gdańsk questioned the decision of the minister of culture about combining the two and ordered works to that effect to be halted until the case is examined. The Ministry of Culture deemed the court's decision as invalid. In January 2017, the Supreme Administrative Court overruled the Voivodeship Administrative Court's decision.

On 30 January 2017, the Voivodeship administrative court in Warsaw halted the combining of the two museums until a lawful examination of the complaint filed by the museum's management and the Commissioner for Human Rights. On March 23, the museum was opened for the public. On April 5, the Supreme Voivodeship Court finally overruled the motion to suspend execution of the regulation of the Minister of Culture and National Heritage. On April 6, Dr Karol Nawrocki was appointed as acting director of the combined facilities.

In September 2019, a statue of Witold Pilecki was erected in front of the museum, showing the cavalry captain in his uniform and a camp cap in hand. The piece's designer was Mr Maciej Jagodziński-Jagennmerr, and the casting and erection cost PLN 400,000.

Building
The Prime Minister of Poland, Donald Tusk, opened the architectural competition to design the main building of the museum. The judging panel included such experts as Daniel Liebeskind and Jack Lohman, the director of the Museum of London. The winning design was created by the Gdynia-based Kwadrat architectural studio. The seat of the museum faces the Motława River and is located on Wałowa Street in close proximity to the Radunia Canal and the historical Polish Post Office Building. The museum grounds cover an area of 2.5 acres and the building itself covers approximately 23,000 square metres. The building consists of three major spheres, which symbolically represent the connection between the past, present and future. The most distinctive part of the building is the 40-metre tall leaning tower with a glass façade, which houses a library, reading and conference rooms as well as cafés and restaurants with a view of the panorama of Gdańsk.

Management
Dr Karol Nawrocki is the museum's director. Prof. dr hab Grzegorz Berendt and Dr Tomasz Szturo are his deputies.
Prof. Dr hab. Paweł Machcewicz was the museum's director until April 5, 2017, and Dr Janusz Marszalec and Dr hab. Piotr M. Majewski served as his deputies.

On 7 February 2018, the Minister of Culture and National Heritage and Deputy Prime Minister Piotr Gliński appointed new members of the museum's management board, which include: Sławomir Cenckiewicz, Marek Jan Chodakiewicz, Jacek Friedrich, Mirosław Golon, Piotr M. Majewski, Bogdan Musiał, Piotr Niwiński, Andrzej Nowak, Piotr Semka, Zbigniew Wawer, Jarosław Wąsowicz, Tadeusz Wolsza, Jan Żaryn.

Reception 
The museum has been praised for its collections, but criticized for what is seen as excessive meddling by the ruling Law and Justice party that made the museum more patriotic and less thought-provoking. In December 2017, a group of five hundred academics signed an open letter that called the changes to the museum "barbaric" and part of an attempt to turn it into a "propaganda institution," while a government spokesperson defended the changes, saying the exhibits needed to be "corrected" and adding that "Some things need to be rearranged, which happens at all museums in the world. But it is also a Polish museum financed by Polish taxpayers. Polish people simply want the museum they have financed to tell their story, to refer to the Polish point of view. The museum is located in Poland and must answer to those who financed it."

Gallery

See also
Inclined building
Museums in Poland
The International Museum of World War II

References

Further reading

External links 
 Museum’s Official Website

World War II museums in Poland
Museums in Gdańsk
Museums in Poland
2017 establishments in Poland
Museums established in 2017
Inclined buildings